The 2016 Italian GT Championship was the 25th season of the Italian GT Championship, the grand tourer-style sports car racing founded by the Italian automobile club (Automobile Club d'Italia). The season started on 30 April 2016  at Monza and ended on 16 October 2016 at Mugello after seven double-header meetings.

Teams and drivers

SuperGT3

GT3

SuperGTCup

GTCup

GT4

Cayman
All entries use a Cayman GT4 Clubsport.

Race calendar and results
All races are scheduled to be held in Italy.

Championship standings
Only the best twelve results count towards each championship.

GT3 championship

GTCup championship

References

External links
 

Italian GT season
Italian Motorsports Championships